Alexander Wells may refer to:

Alexander Wells (California judge) (1819–1854), California Supreme Court Justice
Alexander F. Wells (1912–1994), British chemist and crystallographer
Alexander H. Wells (died 1857), New York attorney and politician
Alexander Wells (baseball) (born 1997), baseball player